The 2020–21 Oklahoma State Cowboys basketball team represented Oklahoma State University during the 2020–21 NCAA Division I men's basketball season. The team was led by fourth-year head coach Mike Boynton, and played their home games at Gallagher-Iba Arena in Stillwater, Oklahoma as a member of the Big 12 Conference. They finished the season 21-9, 11-7 in Big 12 Play to finish in 5th place. They defeated West Virginia and Baylor to advance to the championship game of the Big 12 tournament where they lost to Texas. They received an at-large bid to the NCAA tournament where they defeated Liberty in the First Round before getting upset in the Second Round by Oregon State.

Previous season 
The Cowboys finished the 2019–20 season 18–14, 7–11 in Big 12 play to finish in eighth place. They defeated Iowa State in the first round of the Big 12 tournament before all remaining games were canceled due to the COVID-19 pandemic.

Departures

Incoming Transfers

Recruits

Roster

Schedule and results

|-
!colspan=12 style=|Regular Season

|-
!colspan=9 style=|Big 12 Tournament

|-
!colspan=9 style=|NCAA tournament

References

Oklahoma State Cowboys basketball seasons
Oklahoma State Cowboys
Oklahoma State Cowboys basketball
Oklahoma State Cowboys basketball
Oklahoma State